Kreuzinger is a surname. Notable people with the surname include:

Aarne Kreuzinger-Janik (born 1950), German lieutenant general
Christof Kreuzinger (born 1948), German rower
Kurt Kreuzinger (1905–1989), German botanist

See also
 Kreutziger
 Kreutzinger